Jasmone is an organic compound, which is a volatile portion of the oil from jasmine flowers.  It is a colorless to pale yellow liquid.  Jasmone can exist in two isomeric forms with differing geometry around the pentenyl double bond, cis-jasmone and trans-jasmone.  The natural extract contains only the cis form, while synthetic material is often a mixture of both, with the cis form predominating.  Both forms have similar odors and chemical properties.  Its structure was deduced by Lavoslav Ružička.

Jasmone is produced by some plants by the metabolism of jasmonic acid, via a decarboxylation.  It can act as either an attractant or a repellent for various insects.  Commercially jasmone is used primarily in perfumes and cosmetics.

References

Enones
Cyclopentenes